Jeroen Vervoort (born 18 June 1956) is a retired Dutch rower. He competed at the 1980 Summer Olympics in the quadruple sculls and finished in eights place, together with Victor Scheffers, Rob Robbers and his elder brother Ronald Vervoort.

References

1956 births
Living people
Dutch male rowers
Olympic rowers of the Netherlands
Rowers at the 1980 Summer Olympics
Sportspeople from Tilburg